The Buen Retiro Park (Spanish: Parque del Buen Retiro, literally "Good Retreat Park"), Retiro Park or simply El Retiro is one of the largest parks of the city of Madrid, Spain. The park belonged to the Spanish Monarchy until the late 19th century, when it became a public park.

In 2021, Buen Retiro Park became part of a combined UNESCO World Heritage Site with Paseo del Prado.

Location
The Buen Retiro Park is a large and popular  park at the edge of the city centre, very close to the Puerta de Alcalá and not far from the Prado Museum. On its grounds are gardens, statues and other monuments, galleries, an artificial lake, and venues which host a variety of events. The park is entirely surrounded by the present-day city.

History of the park and palace

In 1505, at the time of Isabella I (r. 1474–1504) the Jeronimos monastery was moved from an unsuitable location elsewhere to the present site of San Jeronimo el Real Church, and a new monastery built in Isabelline Gothic style. The royal family had a retreat built as part of the church.

King Philip II (r. 1556–1598) moved the Spanish court to Madrid in 1561. Philip had the Retiro enlarged by his architect Juan Bautista de Toledo, and formal avenues of trees were laid out.

The gardens were extended in the 1620s, when Gaspar de Guzmán, Count-Duke of Olivares, Philip IV's powerful favourite, gave the king several tracts of land in the vicinity for the Court's recreational use. Olivares determined to build, in a place that the king liked, a royal house which should be superior to those villas that Roman nobles had been setting up in the hilly outskirts of Rome during the previous century. Although this second royal residence was to be built in what were then outlying areas of Madrid, it was actually not far from the existing Alcázar or fortress residence, and the location in a cool, wooded area proved to be ideal.

In the 1630s, under the supervision of architects Giovanni Battista Crescenzi and Alonso Carbonell, several buildings were erected in great haste, two of which are still standing: the "Casón del Buen Retiro" which served as a ballroom, and the "Salón de Reinos" (Hall of Kingdoms), its walls decorated with paintings by Velázquez and Zurbarán and frescoes by Luca Giordano.

The Count-Duke of Olivares commissioned the park in the 1630s, worked on by Cosimo Lotti, a garden designer who had worked under Bernardo Buontalenti on the layout of the Boboli Gardens for Cosimo I, Grand Duke of Tuscany. Water was a distinguishing trait of the garden from the outset: the great pond, Estanque del Retiro, which served as the setting for mock naval battles and other aquatic displays, the great canal, the narrow channel, the chamfered or bellflower pond, created —along with the chapels— the basic layout of the gardens. Buen Retiro was described as "The world art wonder of the time", probably the last great creation of the Renaissance in Spain. Buen Retiro became the center of Habsburg court life at a time when Spain was the foremost power in the world. During the reigns of Philip IV and Charles II several magnificent plays were performed in the park for the royal family and the court.

The gardens were neglected after the death of Philip IV in 1665, but have been restored and changed on many occasions, notably after being opened to the public in 1767 and becoming the property of the municipality in 1868.

Philip V (1700–1746) ordered the creation of a parterre, the only French-style garden in the complex. During the reign of Ferdinand VI, Buen Retiro was the setting for magnificent Italian operas. Charles III (1759–1788) saw to the beautification of its perimeter, replacing the old walls with elegant wrought-iron railings. Juan de Villanueva's Astronomical Observatory was built during the reign of Charles IV (1788–1808).

The Buen Retiro Palace was used until the era of Charles III. Most of the palace and its gardens were destroyed during the Peninsular War (1807–1814) when the troops First French Empire built the citadel of Madrid on its grounds.

The reign of Queen Isabella II saw profound changes in the Retiro. During the queen's minority, the gardens enjoyed a particularly prosperous period, with the planting of shade and fruit trees, and previously unplanted areas like the "Campo Grande", were landscaped as well. The gardens eventually passed to public ownership in 1868, at the time of the overthrow of Queen Isabella. In 1883 it hosted the Exposición Nacional de Minería. 14 ha of the park served as fairgrounds of the 1887 Philippines Exposition, which included a human zoo.

The Retiro gradually became the green heart of the city. At the beginning of the 20th century, the Monument to Alfonso XII of Spain was erected next to the pond, designed by architect José Grases Riera. Countless statues, fountains and commemorative monuments have filled the park and converted it into an open-air sculpture museum.

The 1930s and 1940s witnessed the creation of new gardens attributed to Chief Gardener Cecilio Rodriguez who designed and built the rose garden.

Features of the Park

Close to the northern entrance of the park is the Estanque del Retiro ("Retirement Pond"), a large artificial pond. Next to it is the monument to King Alfonso XII, featuring a semicircular colonnade and an equestrian statue of the monarch on the top of a tall central core.

The Rosaleda (rose garden) is an early 20th century feature inspired by the Bagatelle rose garden in the Bois de Boulogne. 
Near the roses stands the Fountain of the Fallen Angel, erected in 1922, whose main sculpture El Angel Caído (at the top) is a work by Ricardo Bellver (1845–1924) inspired by a passage from John Milton's Paradise Lost, which represents Lucifer falling from Heaven. It is claimed that this statue is the only known public monument of Satan.

The few remaining buildings of the Buen Retiro Palace, including Casón del Buen Retiro and the Salon de Reinos, now house museum collections. The Casón has a collection of 19th- and 20th-century paintings, including art by the Spanish painter Joaquín Sorolla. The Ejército, one of Spain's foremost Army museums, has moved to Toledo.

Since assuming its role as a public park the late 19th century, the "Parque del Retiro" has been used as a venue for various international exhibitions. Several emblematic buildings have remained as testimony to such events, including the Mining building, popularly known as the Velázquez Palace (1884) by architect Ricardo Velázquez Bosco, who also designed the Palacio de Cristal ("Crystal Palace"), a glass pavilion inspired by The Crystal Palace in London, undoubtedly the gardens' most extraordinary building. Built along with its artificial pond in 1887 for the Philippine Islands Exhibitions, the Palacio de Cristal was first used to display flower species indigenous to the archipelago. The landscape-style gardens located in the former "Campo Grande" are also a reminder of the international exhibitions that have taken place here in the past.

The Paseo de la Argentina, also popularly known as Paseo de las Estatuas ("Statue Walk"), is decorated with some of the statues of kings from the Royal Palace, sculpted between 1750 and 1753.

There are now art galleries in the Crystal Palace, Palacio de Velázquez, and Casa de Vacas.

In the Retiro Park is also the Forest of Remembrance (Bosque del recuerdo), a memorial monument to commemorate the 191 victims of the 11 March 2004 Madrid attacks.

Activities

From late May through early October, every Sunday at midday, the Banda Sinfónica de Madrid gives free concerts from the bandstand in the park near the Calle de Alcalá. Manuel Lillo Torregrosa composed 'Kiosko del Retiro' to this bandstand.

The Park also features an annual Book Fair. Not only is there an annual book fair, but shelves for used books where people will drop off their used books, magazines, or newspapers. There are events throughout the year such as concerts, firework shows, and holiday/cultural events.

There is also an outdoor exercising area for both the old and the young. While the older one includes equipment to stretch, keep arthritis in check, and keeps the elderly active with things such as bicycle pedals. The younger portion includes bars for triceps dips, pull-ups, sit-ups, and locals have brought bigger stones to use as weights.

Around the lake, Retiro Pond, many puppet shows perform, and all manner of street performers and fortune tellers. Rowboats can be rented to paddle about the Estanque, and horse-drawn carriages are available.

Retiro provides multiple different sports courts that are managed by the city.

For children there are multiple playground areas. The inside of the Palacio de Cristal has been modified to include a stone slide.

The major paths and walkways are used by families, runners, bikers and rollerbladers.

Notes

External links

Parque del Buen Retiro — a Gardens Guide history
Paseo del Prado and Buen Retiro, a landscape of Arts and Sciences UNESCO collection on Google Arts and Culture
The park's entry in a Walking Tour of Madrid

Parks in Madrid
Buen Retiro Park
Art gallery districts
Calle de Alcalá
Urban public parks